Folio Weekly is an alternative weekly newspaper published in Jacksonville, Florida. It covers topics such as politics, lifestyle, and entertainment.

It is the largest and most influential alternative paper in Northeast Florida and is distributed in Duval, St. Johns and Clay.

History
The newspaper was founded in April 1987.

It was a member of the Association of Alternative Newsmedia and had won multiple AAN Awards. The paper had a circulation of 15,000 - 20,000 as of February 2019.

It was recently acquired by Boldland Press, Inc. Attorney John Michael Phillips has been linked to the ownership group.

In March 2021, it was converted into a monthly newspaper due to lack of revenue. It has since began to publish twice a month.

References

External links
 Folio Weekly's official site

Alternative weekly newspapers published in the United States
Mass media in Jacksonville, Florida
Newspapers published in Florida
Newspapers established in 1987
1987 establishments in Florida
Defunct newspapers published in Florida
2021 disestablishments in Florida